Horst Meyer (20 June 1941 — 24 January 2020) was a German rower who was most successful in the eights. In this event he won a silver and a gold Olympic medal (1964 and 1968), two world titles (1962 and 1966), and four consecutive European titles (1963–1967).

References

External links
 

1941 births
2020 deaths
West German male rowers
Rowers from Hamburg
Olympic rowers of West Germany
Olympic rowers of the United Team of Germany
Rowers at the 1964 Summer Olympics
Rowers at the 1968 Summer Olympics
Olympic gold medalists for West Germany
Olympic silver medalists for the United Team of Germany
Olympic medalists in rowing
World Rowing Championships medalists for West Germany
Medalists at the 1968 Summer Olympics
Medalists at the 1964 Summer Olympics
European Rowing Championships medalists